This is a glossary of technical terms, jargon, diver slang and acronyms used in underwater diving. The definitions listed are in the context of underwater diving. There may be other meanings in other contexts.

Underwater diving can be described as a human activity – intentional, purposive, conscious and subjectively meaningful sequence of actions. Underwater diving is practiced as part of an occupation, or for recreation, where the practitioner submerges below the surface of the water or other liquid for a period which may range between seconds to the order of a day at a time, either exposed to the ambient pressure or isolated by a pressure resistant suit, to interact with the underwater environment for pleasure, competitive sport, or as a means to reach a work site for profit, as a public service, or in the pursuit of knowledge, and may use no equipment at all, or a wide range of equipment which may include breathing apparatus, environmental protective clothing, aids to vision, communication, propulsion, maneuverability, buoyancy and safety equipment, and tools for the task at hand.

Many of the terms are in general use by English speaking divers from many parts of the world, both amateur and professional, and using any of the modes of diving. Others are more specialised, variable by location, mode, or professional environment. There are instances where a term may have more than one meaning depending on context, and others where several terms refer to the same concept, or there are variations in spelling. A few are loan-words from other languages.

There are five sub-glossaries, listed here. The tables of content should link between them automatically:
Glossary of underwater diving terminology: A–C
Glossary of underwater diving terminology: D–G
Glossary of underwater diving terminology: H–O 
Glossary of underwater diving terminology: P–S
Glossary of underwater diving terminology: T–Z

Underwater diving terminology
Underwater diving